Edward Henry Howard (13 February 1829 – 16 September 1892) was an English Catholic priest and archbishop, who was made a cardinal in 1877. He was a relative of the Dukes of Norfolk.

Howard is in the episcopal lineage of Pope Francis.

Life
Howard was the son of Edward Gyles Howard, by his marriage to Frances Anne Heneage, and was educated at St Mary's College, Oscott. His father was the son of Edward Charles Howard, the youngest brother of Bernard Howard, 12th Duke of Norfolk. His father's sister Julia Barbara Howard was married to Henry Stafford-Jerningham, 9th Baron Stafford, from 1829 until she died in 1856.

After a short stint of service as a British Army officer with the Life Guards, during which he commanded the detachment escorting the hearse at the Duke of Wellington's funeral in 1852, Howard resigned his commission to study for the priesthood at the Academy of Noble Ecclesiastics in Rome, and was ordained a priest in 1854. He served as a missionary in Goa, Portuguese India. After his return to Rome, he continued to work with Englishmen who wished to convert from Anglicanism to the Church of Rome. In June 1871, he was made titular Archbishop of Neocaesaria in partibus and assistant bishop to the Cardinal Bishop of Frascati.

Howard was promoted to Cardinal-Priest of Ss. Giovanni e Paolo on 12 March 1877 and in 1878 appointed Protector of the English College at Rome, an institution to which he later left his valuable library. For about a year, he was papal envoy to Goa, India, to negotiate between the British and the Portuguese authorities the settlement of the problems concerning the ecclesiastical government of the Province of Goa. He wanted to become a missionary in the East but the Pope Pius IX insisted that he stay in Rome. He served in pastoral ministry in Rome as confessor of the poor and the soldiers. In December 1881 he became Archpriest of Saint Peter's Basilica. On 24 March 1884 he became Cardinal-Bishop of the suburbicarian diocese of Frascati.

In failing health, he retired to Brighton shortly before his death, which occurred on 16 September 1892.  He is buried at the Fitzalan Chapel in Arundel, West Sussex.

Honours
 Knight Grand Cross of the Royal Order of Kalākaua I, 1881

References

External links
Dudley Baxter, England's Cardinals pages 82–85
New Zealand Tablet, The New English Cardinal
John Martin Robinson, The Duke of Norfolk, A Quincentennial History

1829 births
1892 deaths
20th-century British cardinals
Cardinals created by Pope Pius IX
Cardinal-bishops of Frascati
Edward Henry
British Life Guards officers
Knights Grand Cross of the Royal Order of Kalākaua
English College, Rome alumni